The Talaat Pasha cabinets were headed by Grand Vizier Talaat Pasha. It was formed on February 4 after Said Halim Pasha's resignation. It was composed of members of the Union and Progress Party. The cabinet was dissolved upon Mehmed V's death, Mehmed VI again appointed Talaat Pasha as his Grand Vizier following his sword girthing. Talaat Pasha resigned due to Ottoman defeat in the Great War on 8 October, but stayed in office for a few more days running a caretaker government.

The government was noted for being one of the smallest war time cabinets of WWI.

List of ministers

References 

Committee of Union and Progress
1917 establishments in the Ottoman Empire
1918 disestablishments in the Ottoman Empire
Talaat Pasha